Organ donation in the United States prison population is the donation of biological tissues or organs from incarcerated individuals to living recipients in need of a transplantation.

General prison population

As living donors
Prisons typically do not allow inmates to donate organs as living donors to anyone but immediate family members. There is no law against prisoner organ donation; however, the transplant community has discouraged use of prisoner's organs since the early 1990s due to concern over prisons' high-risk environment for infectious diseases. Physicians and ethicists also criticize the idea because a prisoner is not able to consent to the procedure in a free and non-coercive environment, especially if they are given inducements to participate. Also, many prisoners would not be eligible donors due to age as a great number of those on death row are in their fifties or older.  However, with modern testing advances to more safely rule out infectious disease and by ensuring that there are no incentives offered to participate, some have argued that prisoners can now voluntarily consent to organ donation just as they can now consent to medical procedures in general. With careful safeguards, and with over 2 million prisoners in the U.S., they reason that prisoners can provide a solution for reducing organ shortages in the U.S.

As recipients
In the United States, prisoners are not discriminated against as organ recipients and are equally eligible for organ transplants along with the general population. In Estelle v. Gamble, decided in 1976, the United States Supreme Court ruled that withholding health care from prisoners constitutes "cruel and unusual punishment". United Network for Organ Sharing, the organization that coordinates available organs with recipients, does not factor in a patient's prison status when determining suitability for a transplant.
An organ transplant and follow-up care can cost the prison system up to one million dollars. If a prisoner qualifies, a state may allow compassionate early release to avoid the high costs associated with organ transplants. However, an organ transplant may save the prison system substantial costs usually associated with dialysis and other life-extending treatments required by the prisoner with the failing organ. Living organ donation, as an alternative to deceased organ donation, has become an option given its low complication rates and more positive outcomes. For example, the estimated cost of a kidney transplant is about $111,000. A prisoner's dialysis treatments are estimated to cost a prison $120,000 per year.

Because donor organs are in short supply, there are more people waiting for a transplant than available organs. When a prisoner receives an organ, there is a high probability that someone else will die waiting for the next available organ. A response to this ethical dilemma states that felons who have a history of violent crime, who have violated others’ basic rights, have lost the right to receive an organ transplant, though it is noted that it would be necessary "to reform our justice system to minimize the chance of an innocent person being wrongly convicted of a violent crime and thus being denied an organ transplant"

Death row inmates
The practice of death row inmates donating organs while alive follows closely to that of their more general inmate counterparts. Where they differ is in their inability to have their organs donated following their execution. Although no law specifically forbids death row inmates from donating organs postmortem, as of 2013 all requests by death row inmates to donate their organs after execution have been denied by states. Additionally there is debate about whether current organ donation guidelines, outlined in the National Organ Transplant Act of 1984 and the Uniform Anatomical Gift Act, implicitly prohibit death row inmates from being organ donors.

Questions regarding the benefits, practicality, morality and ethics of allowing death row inmates to donate their organs postmortem have garnered attention following two highly publicized events: an editorial by condemned prisoner Christian Longo published in The New York Times advocating for the right of fellow death row inmates to donate their organs, and the request by death row inmate Gregory Scott Johnson to have his execution stayed until he could donate a portion of his hepatitis-infected liver to his debilitated sister.

The answers to these questions have been variably debated by the public, professional medical organizations, and bioethicists.
A limited number of opinion polls have indicated broad favor for the practice within both the general public and organ recipients. In contrast transplant and medical societies have generally opposed the practice, and bioethicists have been divided.

Benefits
Organ donation has the potential to greatly improve quality of life as well as prevent death in patients with end-stage organ failure. There is an endemic shortage of organ donors within the United States, resulting in an immediate and persistent need for additional, suitable organ donors. Death row inmates are a possible source of additional organs. However, the quality and amount of organs that death row inmates can potentially contribute is debated, but would definitely not remove more than a small percentage of people on transplant waiting lists.

Practical barriers
Suitability
The same reasons that make the general prison population less suitable to be organ donors—poor health and increased chance of infectious disease—also apply to death row inmates. However, due to the preplanned nature of executions and lengthy time periods before they are carried out death row inmates have a greater potential to be screened thoroughly beforehand. Additionally many death row inmates are in isolation from the general population, reducing their chances of having contracted a communicable disease.

Other factors, however, variably decrease the suitability of death row inmates as organ donors. The average age of people on death row is over fifty, and chronic medical conditions such as diabetes and hypertension are common. Potentially half of the death row inmates would be unsuitable for organ donation.

Medical constraints
The primary method of execution in the United States is via lethal injection which generally involves the administration of three drugs: sodium thiopental, a sedative to induce unconsciousness, pancuronium bromide (Pavulon), a muscle relaxant to cause respiratory arrest, and potassium chloride to trigger cardiac arrest. Organ donation following this method of lethal injection is often compared to donation after circulatory death (DCD). Similar to DCD organ donation following lethal injection faces the challenge of gathering organs before they become unusable due to hypoxia. Both the American Medical Association and the American Society of Anesthesiology oppose their members from participating in executions, although their abilities to sanction members for doing so are limited. In order to avoid the transplanting physician's involvement in the death of the inmate, the cause of death must be determined to be from lethal injection, and not from the removal of the patients organs. This means that after lethal injection, the medical examiner waits 10–15 minutes to test for sign of cardiac activity before pronouncing them dead. During this time hypoxia destroying the organs becomes a serious issue, but removal of the organs any earlier risks making the removal of the inmate’s organs the cause of death and not the lethal injection.

Additionally the facilities that oversee executions are not equipped to handle the organ removal surgery. Revamping these facilities to be able to handle such surgeries would be very costly. This leaves two other options, changing the location of execution to a hospital, or moving inmates to a hospital after their execution. The first option would be difficult due to hospitals not wanting to oversee executions, and the second option risks further hypoxia of the organs during the time it takes to transport the inmates.

Moral and ethical considerations
Some considerations for organ donation from those on death row mirror those of general prison population. Indirect coercion, and mental stress can possibly impair the ability of a death row inmate to make a fully informed decision. Becoming an organ donor may influence the appeals process, where sympathy or the chance of another individual benefiting from the inmates death may come into consideration. Additionally there is fear that the possibility of organ donation could influence the judgement jurors who may weigh the possibility of someone being able to live at the expense of the accused when deciding their verdict. Thus, whether or not depriving death row inmates the ability to donate their organs is protecting their rights, or stripping them away, continues to be debated.

See also
 Bioethics
 Medical law
 Prisoner rights in the United States
 Participation of medical professionals in American executions

References

Organ donation
Capital punishment in the United States
Medical controversies in the United States
Imprisonment and detention in the United States